&&&&& is the debut mixtape by Venezuelan electronic producer Arca. It was released on 23 July 2013 through Hippos in Tanks on SoundCloud. Even though 14 tracks are listed, the entire mixtape is in sequence as a single track. A vinyl release of the mixtape with an alternative album cover was released in January 2014 and was limited to 500 copies. On 28 July  2020, Arca announced a re-release of &&&&& through PAN, making the mixtape available on mainstream streaming platforms for the first time on 18 September 2020.

Composition 
&&&&& is an experimental electronic record with influences of dub, hip-hop, grime, ambient music, trap, and glitch. Stereogum described the record as "even darker and denser" than Arca's two previous Stretch EPs.

Critical reception

&&&&& received critical acclaim from music critics. Tiny Mix Tapes says the mixtape "has the potential to conjure an emotional frenzy that’s alluring to the senses in a way that so much electronic artistry fails to even approach." No Ripcord praised the mixtape for "its density, its intensity, its I'm-lost-in-a-big-city feel, its warm gust of beats blowing while the subway comes squeaking into the station, its darkness, its late-night ecstasy, its rawness, its rawness like raw milk, like drinking raw milk or eating sushi in an inexpensive restaurant somewhere on a street with trash and tweakers, its little motifs that twinkle like stars or Christmas lights, its muscular compactness." In a review of the reissue, Pitchfork said that "there’s something a bit melancholy about listening to &&&&& now—the feeling that instead of freeing us from the past, technology has left us stuck in a loop, endlessly refreshing in search of a better world that never arrives, but that we can still dream of in our art."

The album was eventually sent to Icelandic musician Björk's management, leading to the two artists collaborating on her eighth studio album Vulnicura.

Track listing

Personnel
 Arca – production
 Jesse Kanda – artwork

Charts

References

External links
 

2013 mixtape albums
Arca (musician) albums
Albums produced by Arca (musician)
Self-released albums
Albums free for download by copyright owner
Debut mixtape albums
PAN (record label) albums